Hilda Marjorie James (27 April 1904 – 27 July 1982) was a British competitive swimmer who competed at the 1920 Summer Olympics.  James won a silver medal in the women's 4×100-metre freestyle relay and swam in semifinals of the 300-metre freestyle event. She held seven world records and 29 English records.

Life
James was born in 1904 to Gertrude Acton and John James. Her father was a postman and window cleaner. She began training at the Garston Baths in Liverpool. Her initial swims were arranged for her to occupy her time during her school's religious classes as her parents did not want to her to attend.

By the time she was 16 she was the best choice to go to the Olympics, but her speed was no match for the Americans who took most of the medals. There were not many swimming events for women but the British relay team took silver in the  freestyle relay. By 1924 she held every British record from 100 yards to the mile. She should have gone to the 1924 Olympics but she was yet 21 and her mother demanded that she should be sent too as chaperone. In the stand off over this James lost her place. She was thought to have taken three medals she cited "unfair criticism, unfair treatment and boycott by certain officials in the swimming world." Very shortly after the Olympics she gained independence on her 21st birthday and she took a job with Cunard Line. She was employed as celebrity. She resigned this job in 1927 as she was to be the first woman to swim the English channel. She prepared in France but no attempt was made that year, and in the October Mercedes Gleitze became the first woman to swim the channel. Another attempt by James was proposed for 1928 but it never happened. One source says that during this time she was still working for Cunard.

She married (William) Hugh McAllister in 1930 who worked on Cunard's luxury liner Carinthia. They had one child, Donald Hugh McAllister. That same year in March, Mercedes Gleitze was in Liverpool where she was attempting a 31-hour exhibition endurance swim. James turned up without warning and after Gleitze realised who she was she took up her offer to look after her and feed her during the long night of her attempt.

Hilda died in 1982 in Birkenhead.

Records
She held seven world records and 29 English records and every British record from 150 yards to one mile.

See also
 List of Olympic medalists in swimming (women)
 World record progression 400 metres freestyle

References

External links

 Her biography "Lost Olympics" - Ian Hugh McAllister

1904 births
1982 deaths
English female swimmers
English female freestyle swimmers
World record setters in swimming
Olympic silver medallists for Great Britain
Olympic swimmers of Great Britain
People from Warrington
Swimmers at the 1920 Summer Olympics
Medalists at the 1920 Summer Olympics
Olympic silver medalists in swimming
20th-century English women